Kathleen Hirsch (born June 1, 1953) is an American author.

Hirsch received her B.A. in political science and English in 1975 at Mount Holyoke College and her M.F.A in fiction writing from Brown University in 1979. She joined the staff of The Boston Phoenix in 1983, reporting on Boston's subcultures and marginal populations.  She profiled two homeless women in a book, "Songs from the Alley."  

She has taught writing at Boston College, Harvard University, Wellesley College, and Brown University.  She is a contributor to the Boston Globe's Catholic news site, Crux.

Works
 2001: A Sabbath Life: A Woman's Search for Wholeness
 1998: A Home in the Heart of a City: A Woman's Search for Community
 1997: "Mothers: Twenty Stories of Contemporary Motherhood" - co-editor with Katrina Kenison
 1989: Songs from the Alley

References

1953 births
Living people
20th-century American novelists
21st-century American novelists
American women novelists
Boston College faculty
Harvard University faculty
Wellesley College faculty
Brown University faculty
Mount Holyoke College alumni
20th-century American women writers
21st-century American women writers
Novelists from Massachusetts
American women academics